Joanna Heights is an unincorporated community in southern Berks County, Pennsylvania, United States.

It is located near the town of Joanna, in Robeson Township. The village is served by the Twin Valley School District.

Notes

Unincorporated communities in Berks County, Pennsylvania
Unincorporated communities in Pennsylvania